Churchville   is a community  in the Canadian province of Nova Scotia, located in Pictou County.

References
Churchville on Destination Nova Scotia

Communities in Pictou County